Abbevillian (formerly also Chellean) is a term for the oldest lithic industry found in Europe, dated to between roughly 600,000 and 400,000 years ago.

The original artifacts were collected from road construction sites on the Somme river near Abbeville by a French customs officer, Boucher de Perthes. He published his findings in 1836.
Subsequently, Louis Laurent Gabriel de Mortillet (1821–1898), professor of prehistoric anthropology at the School of Anthropology in Paris, published (1882) "Le Prehistorique, antiquité de l'homme", in which he was the first to characterize periods by the name of a site. 

Chellean included artifacts discovered at the town of Chelles, a suburb of Paris. They are similar to those found at Abbeville. Later anthropologists substituted Abbevillian for Chellean, the latter of which is no longer in use.

Abbevillian tool users were the first archaic humans in Europe, classified as either late Homo erectus
as Homo antecessor or as Homo heidelbergensis.

History 
The label Abbevillian prevailed until the Leakey family discovered older (yet similar) artifacts at Olduvai Gorge (a.k.a. Oldupai Gorge), starting in 1959, and promoted the African origin of man. Olduwan (or Oldowan) soon replaced Abbevillian in describing African and Asian paleoliths. The term Abbevillian is still used, but it is now restricted to Europe. The label, however, continues to lose popularity as a scientific designation.

Mortillet had portrayed his traditions as chronologically sequential. In the Abbevillian, early Palaeolithic hominins used cores; in the Acheulian, flakes. Olduwan tools, however, indicate that in the earliest Palaeolithic, the distinction between flake and core is less clear. Consequently, there also is a tendency to view Abbevillian as an early phase of Acheulian.

Provenience of the type
The Abbevillian type site is on the 150-foot terrace of the River Somme.

The Abbevillian is a phase of Olduwan that occurred in Europe near, but not at, the end of the Lower Palaeolithic (2.5 mya. – 2,500,000 years ago). Those who adopt the Abbevillian scheme refer to it as the middle Acheulian, about - years ago. Geologically it occurred in the Middle Pleistocene, younger than about 700,000 years ago. It spanned the Günz-Mindel interglacial period between the Günz and the Mindel, but more recent finds of the East Anglian Palaeolithic push the date back into the Günz, closer to the  ya mark.

The Abbevillian culture bearers are not believed to have evolved in Europe, but to have entered it from further east. It was thus preceded by the earlier Olduwan of Homo erectus, and the Upper Acheulian, of which Clactonian and Tayacian are considered phases, supplanted it. 
The Acheulian there went on into the Levalloisian and Mousterian are associated with Neanderthal man.

Abbevillian sites in Europe
To avoid the question of what culture name should be used to describe European artifacts, some, such as Schick and Toth, refer to "non-handaxe" and "handaxe" sites. Handaxes came into use at about the 500,000 ya mark. Non-handaxe sites are often the same sites as handaxe sites, the difference being one of time, or, if geographically different, have no discernible spatial pattern. The physical evidence is summarized in the table below Note that the dates assigned vary widely after 700,000 ya and, except where substantiated by scientific methods, should be viewed as tentative and on the speculative side.

Notes

Footnotes

References

See also
 Timeline of glaciation
 List of human fossils

Further reading

External links
 The Abbevillian Culture, section in a pdf document. Search on Abbevillian.
 Early Palaeolithic. This site presents the view that Olduwan and Abbevillian are phases of the Acheulean.

Archaeological cultures of Europe
Abbeville